Radhika Jones (born January 23, 1973) is an American magazine editor and the fifth editor-in-chief of Vanity Fair magazine. She succeeded Graydon Carter who retired in 2017 after 25 years in the role.

She formerly served as the editorial director for the books department at The New York Times, deputy managing editor of Time and the managing editor of The Paris Review.

Early life and education 
Jones was born in New York to an American father, Robert L. Jones, a folk musician, and an Indian mother, Marguerite Jones (who had come to Europe to study languages), who met in Paris in 1970. She grew up in Cincinnati and Ridgefield, Connecticut. She has a brother and a sister named Nalini, who is an author. Jones has a BA from Harvard University and a PhD in English and Comparative Literature from Columbia where she has also taught courses in writing and literature.

Career 
Jones began her career in Moscow as the arts editor of the English-language Moscow Times. She was the managing editor of The Paris Review before moving to Time as culture editor in 2008. During her employment at Time she oversaw its yearly listing of the 100 most influential people and Person of the Year. In 2016 she joined The New York Times as the editorial director of the books department.

On 13 November 2017, Condé Nast formally announced Jones's appointment as editor-in-chief of Vanity Fair. She began working on 11 December 2017. According to The Guardian, Jones was nominated for the position and championed by David Remnick, the editor of The New Yorker.

Personal life
Jones lives in Brooklyn with her husband and son.

References

External links

Living people
21st-century American journalists
American magazine editors
Women magazine editors
People from Ridgefield, Connecticut
Harvard University alumni
Columbia Graduate School of Arts and Sciences alumni
Vanity Fair (magazine) editors
Time (magazine) people
1973 births
American people of Indian descent
Managing editors